Andrew Eric Feitosa (born 1 September 1992), commonly known as Morato, is a Brazilian footballer who plays as a winger for Saudi Arabian club Al-Khaleej.

Club career
Morato was born in Francisco Morato, São Paulo, Morato finished his formation with Olé Brasil. In 2011 he moved abroad, joining K League Classic side Gyeongnam FC.

Morato made his professional debut on 23 July 2011, coming on as a late substitute for Yoon Bit-garam in a 2–2 away draw against Incheon United. After six matches, only two as a starter, he was released.

Morato subsequently returned to his homeland, and represented Ferroviária, Mogi Mirim and Boa Esporte in quick succession. On 8 December 2015 he signed for Audax, but moved to FC Cascavel the following 18 February.

After scoring doubles against Maringá and J. Malucelli, Morato was presented at Ituano on 4 May 2016. He was a regular starter for the club during the Série D and the Campeonato Paulista campaigns, notably scoring a brace in a 5–0 home routing of Metropolitano on 9 July.

On 11 April 2017, Morato signed an eight-month contract with São Paulo, club he already represented as a youth. He made his debut for the club eight days later, starting and assisting Lucas Pratto in a 2–1 Copa do Brasil away win against Cruzeiro.

On 7 August 2018, Morato was loaned to fellow top tier side Sport as a part of Everton Felipe's deal to São Paulo. On 15 January 2019, Ituano announced that Morato had returned to the club.

In April 2019, after performing well in the state league for Ituano, Morato was transferred to newly-merged Red Bull Bragantino, where he won the 2019 Campeonato Brasileiro Série B.

On 13 August 2022, Morato joined Saudi Arabian club Al-Khaleej on a two-year deal.

Career statistics

References

External links

1992 births
Living people
Footballers from São Paulo (state)
Brazilian footballers
Association football forwards
Campeonato Brasileiro Série A players
Campeonato Brasileiro Série B players
Campeonato Brasileiro Série D players
K League 1 players
Saudi Professional League players
Associação Ferroviária de Esportes players
Mogi Mirim Esporte Clube players
Boa Esporte Clube players
Ituano FC players
São Paulo FC players
Sport Club do Recife players
Red Bull Bragantino players
CR Vasco da Gama players
Avaí FC players
Khaleej FC players
Gyeongnam FC players
Brazilian expatriate footballers
Brazilian expatriate sportspeople in South Korea
Expatriate footballers in South Korea
Brazilian expatriate sportspeople in Saudi Arabia
Expatriate footballers in Saudi Arabia